This is a list of Danish television related events from 2000.

Events
19 February - Olsen Brothers are selected to represent Denmark at the 2000 Eurovision Song Contest with their song "Smuk som et stjerneskud". They are selected to be the twenty-ninth Danish Eurovision entry during Dansk Melodi Grand Prix held at the Circus Building in Copenhagen.
13 May - Denmark wins the 45th Eurovision Song Contest in Stockholm, Sweden. The winning song is "Fly on the Wings of Love", performed by Olsen Brothers.

Debuts

Domestic
1 October - Rejseholdet (DR) (2000-2004)
Hotellet (DR) (2000-2002)

International
 Pokémon

See also
 2000 in Denmark